Westland District is a territorial authority district on the West Coast of New Zealand's South Island. It is administered by the Westland District Council. The district's population is

History 
Westland was originally a part of Canterbury Province, administered from Christchurch in the East coast. The booming population as a result of the gold rush, together with the difficulty of travel and communication across the Southern Alps, led first to the creation of a special Westland County, then the formal separation of Westland from Canterbury to form the short-lived Westland Province (1873–1876). Westland Province also included what is now the southern portion of Grey District with the provincial boundary at the Grey and Arnold rivers. Greymouth proper was in Westland Province, Cobden, on the north bank of the Grey River, was in Nelson Province .

After the abolition of the provinces in 1876, a new Westland County was created with roughly the same borders as the old Province. About this time, the population relative to the rest of the country began to decline, as the easily accessible gold soon ran out and the conditions were not ideal for farming. Local government changes saw the hinterland of Greymouth on both sides of the Grey River transformed into Greymouth Borough and Grey County and subsequently into Grey District, which includes portions of both historical provinces.

However Westland, as a unit of government, emerged largely intact from the local government reforms of the 1980s and 1990s, merely changing from a County to a District and incorporating the Borough of Hokitika.

Recently the population has begun to grow more quickly due to "lifestyle" residents moving into the District.

Geography 
The District consists of a long thin strip of land between the crest of the Southern Alps and the Tasman Sea. The low-lying areas near the coast are a mixture of pastoral farmland and temperate rainforest. Westland temperate rainforests contain many conifers and receives high rates of precipitation due to orographic lifting caused by the Southern Alps. The eastern part of the District is steep and mountainous. Many small rivers flow down from the mountains. The southern part of the District notably contains the Franz Josef and Fox glaciers.

In the north, the Taramakau River, the largest river in the district, forms the boundary with the Grey District. The crest of the Southern Alps marks the eastern boundary. A small southern boundary lies between Westland proper and Fiordland, which lies within the Southland District. This boundary cannot be crossed by road.

Urban areas and settlements 
Hokitika, the district seat, is the only town in the Westland District with a population over 1,000. It is home to  people, % of the district's population.

Other settlements and localities in the district include:

Hokitika Ward:
 Blue Spur
 Hokitika
 Kaniere
 Seaview

Northern Ward:

 Arahura
 Awatuna
 Dillmanstown
 Jacksons
 Kaihinu
 Kokatahi
 Kumara
 Kumara Junction
 Otira
 Rimu
 Ross
 Ruatapu
 Woodstock
 Chesterfield
 Callaghans
 Stafford
 Goldsborough/Waimea
 Humphreys
 Arthurstown
 Takutai
 Houhou
 Turiwhate
 Wainihinihi
 Milltown
 Kowhitirangi
 Mananui
 Donoghues
 Aickens
 Candys Bend
 Deaths Corner

Southern Ward:

 Bruce Bay
 Fox Glacier
 Franz Josef / Waiau
 Haast
 Hannahs Clearing
 Hari Hari
 Jackson Bay
 Neils Beach
 Ōkārito
 Okuru
 Pukekura
 Te Taho
 Whataroa
 Fergusons
 Kakapotahi
 Waitaha
 Herepo
 The Forks
 Tatare
 Gillespies Beach
 Karangarua
 Jacobs River
 Mahitahi
 Lake Paringa
 Haast Junction
 Haast Beach
 Waiatoto
 Arawhata
 Rotokino
 Lake Moeraki
 Haast Pass/Tiriopatea

Notes: bold - settlement; normal text - locality; italics - minor locality

Demography
The district is the most sparsely populated of New Zealand's 67 territorial authorities.

Westland District had a population of 8,640 at the 2018 New Zealand census, an increase of 336 people (4.0%) since the 2013 census, and an increase of 237 people (2.8%) since the 2006 census. There were 3,747 households. There were 4,356 males and 4,287 females, giving a sex ratio of 1.02 males per female. The median age was 44.4 years (compared with 37.4 years nationally), with 1,449 people (16.8%) aged under 15 years, 1,446 (16.7%) aged 15 to 29, 4,212 (48.8%) aged 30 to 64, and 1,536 (17.8%) aged 65 or older.

Ethnicities were 86.5% European/Pākehā, 14.4% Māori, 2.0% Pacific peoples, 5.2% Asian, and 3.0% other ethnicities. People may identify with more than one ethnicity.

The percentage of people born overseas was 16.3, compared with 27.1% nationally.

Although some people objected to giving their religion, 51.4% had no religion, 36.7% were Christian, 0.9% were Hindu, 0.3% were Muslim, 0.5% were Buddhist and 2.0% had other religions.

Of those at least 15 years old, 1,056 (14.7%) people had a bachelor or higher degree, and 1,656 (23.0%) people had no formal qualifications. The median income was $29,600, compared with $31,800 nationally. 960 people (13.4%) earned over $70,000 compared to 17.2% nationally. The employment status of those at least 15 was that 3,975 (55.3%) people were employed full-time, 1,137 (15.8%) were part-time, and 153 (2.1%) were unemployed.

Government 
The Westland District is governed by an elected Council, headed by an elected Mayor. The Mayor is elected at large. The current Mayor is Helen Lash. Councillors are elected to represent multi-member wards. Three councillors are elected for the Northern Ward, three for the Southern Ward, and four for the town of Hokitika.

The District is one of three included within the West Coast Region.

Economy 
In the early years of settlement in Westland, gold was a major commodity, bringing prospectors flocking into the area. After the gold ran out, those who remained turned to pastoral farming. (Unlike the more northern parts of the West Coast, Westland has not developed coal mining.) In recent years, tourism has become more important, with drawcards such as the glaciers, and events such as the Hokitika Wildfoods Festival.

References

External links

Westland District Council